Hari Singwala is a town located in the Punjab province of Pakistan. It is located in Faisalabad District at 31°21'0N 73°3'0E with an altitude of 166 metres (547 feet) and lies near to the city of Lahore. Neighbouring settlements include Sahibnagar to the east and Pollard Kot to the north.

References

Cities and towns in Faisalabad District